The Estate Brewers Bay, located near the University of the Virgin Islands and John Brewers Bay Beach about  west of Charlotte Amalie on Saint Thomas, U.S. Virgin Islands, is a historic sugar plantation which was listed on the National Register of Historic Places in 1978.

Surviving on the site, at least as of 1977, are the ruins of a sugar factory, later adapted as a residence, and of an animal-powered mill.

The first records of ownership are in 1855;  it appeared on a map in 1856.

References

Sugar plantations in Saint Thomas, U.S. Virgin Islands
Plantations in the Danish West Indies
Buildings and structures completed in 1856
National Register of Historic Places in the United States Virgin Islands
Buildings and structures completed in 1810
1856 establishments in North America
1850s establishments in the Caribbean
1850s establishments in Denmark
19th century in the Danish West Indies
West End, Saint Thomas, U.S. Virgin Islands